Lironoba is a genus of minute sea snails, marine gastropod mollusks or micromollusks in the family Lironobidae.

Species
There are 9 species within the genus Lironoba including:
 Lironoba anomala Powell, 1940
 Lironoba australis (Tenison Woods, 1877)
 Lironoba elegans E. C. Smith, 1962
 Lironoba imbrex (Hedley, 1908)
 Lironoba matai Dell, 1952
 Lironoba rara (Thiele, 1925)
  Lironoba sulcata Cotton, 1944
 Lironoba suteri (Hedley, 1904)
 Lironoba unilirata (Tenison Woods, 1878)
Species brought into synonymy
 †  Lironoba charassa Finlay, 1924: synonym of † Attenuata charassa (Finlay, 1924)
 Lironoba hebes Laseron, 1950: synonym of Onoba hebes (Laseron, 1950) (Basionym)
 †  Lironoba polyvincta Finlay, 1924 †: synonym of † Attenuata polyvincta (Finlay, 1924)

References

External links
 Ponder W. F. (1985) A review of the genera of the Rissoidae (Mollusca: Mesogastropoda: Rissoacea). Records of the Australian Museum supplement 4: 1-221

Lironobidae
Gastropod genera